Photoanethole is a naturally occurring organic compound that is found in anise and fennel.  It has estrogenic activity, and along with anethole and dianethole, may be responsible for the estrogenic effects of anise and fennel. These compounds bear resemblance to the estrogens stilbene and diethylstilbestrol, which may explain their estrogenic activity. In fact, it is said that diethylstilbestrol and related drugs were originally modeled after photoanethole and dianethole.

See also
 Anol
 Hexestrol

References

Phytoestrogens
Stilbenoids